Riad Yassin Abdallah (a.k.a. Riyadh Yassin Abdullah; born 20 June 1955 in Aden) is a Yemeni politician and diplomat. He is the current Yemeni ambassador to France since 2016. Previously, he served as the Foreign Minister of Yemen between March and December 2015. Abdulmalik Al-Mekhlafi succeeds him.

References

Living people
1955 births
Alumni of Kingston University
Place of birth missing (living people)
Yemeni Sunni Muslims

Foreign ministers of Yemen
Health ministers of Yemen
Ambassadors of Yemen to France
21st-century Yemeni politicians